The 2021 Homecoming was the second annual Homecoming professional wrestling television special produced by All Elite Wrestling (AEW). The event marked a brief return to AEW's home base of Daily's Place in Jacksonville, Florida, which is where they had produced shows through the majority of the COVID-19 pandemic, and came after the conclusion of AEW's "Welcome Back" tour, which celebrated the company's resumption of live touring. It was held on August 4, 2021, and was broadcast on TNT as a special episode of AEW's weekly television program, Dynamite.

Production

Background
On January 1, 2020, All Elite Wrestling (AEW) held the inaugural Homecoming special, which emanated from their home base of Daily's Place in Jacksonville, Florida as a special episode of Dynamite. Due to the COVID-19 pandemic that began effecting the industry in mid-March 2020, AEW held the majority of their programs from Daily's Place; these events were originally held without fans, but the company began running shows at 10–15% capacity in August, before eventually running full capacity shows in May 2021. Also in May, AEW announced that they would be returning to live touring, beginning with a special episode of Dynamite titled Road Rager on July 7. Road Rager was also the first of a four-week span of special Dynamite episodes as part of AEW's "Welcome Back" tour, which continued with the two-part Fyter Fest on July 14 and 21 and concluded with Fight for the Fallen on July 28. In early July, AEW scheduled a second Homecoming episode to be held after the conclusion of the "Welcome Back" tour, briefly returning AEW to Daily's Place on August 4. The event was promoted as the final event to be held at Daily's Place for Summer 2021.

Storylines
Homecoming featured professional wrestling matches that involved different wrestlers from pre-existing scripted feuds and storylines. Wrestlers portrayed heroes, villains, or less distinguishable characters in scripted events that built tension and culminated in a wrestling match or series of matches. Storylines were produced on AEW's weekly television program, Dynamite, the supplementary online streaming shows, Dark and Elevation, and The Young Bucks' YouTube series Being The Elite.

Reception

Television ratings
Homecoming averaged 1,102,000 television viewers on TNT, with a 0.46 rating in AEW's key demographic.

Results

See also
2021 in professional wrestling

References

External links

2021
2020s American television specials
2021 American television episodes
2021 in professional wrestling in Florida
2021 in professional wrestling
August 2021 events in the United States
Events in Jacksonville, Florida
Professional wrestling in Jacksonville, Florida